Arthur Townsend was the mayor of Murray, Utah from 1930 to 1932. A native of Derbyshire England, he was born to William and Ruth Townsend. He came to America when he was 13 years old and later he fulfilled a two-year Mormon mission to England. He was a member of the Murray city chamber of commerce and owned the Murray Mercantile Company which he operated for more than 40 years. Prior to establishing the mercantile company he worked on a farm and later as a wallpaper hanger.
During his tenure as Mayor, he was noted for making improvements to Murray’s hydroelectric power station located in Little Cottonwood Canyon.

References 

1868 births
1950 deaths
English emigrants to the United States
English Latter Day Saints
Mayors of Murray, Utah
People from Derbyshire
English Mormon missionaries
Mormon missionaries in England
19th-century Mormon missionaries